William James Paull (March 1846 – 21 September 1926) was a company director and member of the Queensland Legislative Assembly.

Early days
Paull was born in Cran Crae, Cornwall, England to parents William Paull and his wife Ann (née Tregoning). and educated in Cornwall and North Wales. On leaving school he gained experience working in his step-father's silver and lead mines. He migrated to Australia in 1873, firstly to South Australia where he managed the Yandana copper mines and then the Blinman copper mine and smelting works. 

In 1882 he arrived in Queensland where he became the mine director and partner in Pajingo Station, Charters Towers.

Political career
After spending time as a councilor at Charters Towers including two terms as mayor in 1898 and 1901, Paull, standing for the Oppositionists, won the seat of Charters Towers in 1905. He held the seat for two and a half years, being defeated in 1908.

Personal life
In 1884, Paull married Margaret Christie (died 1931) in Melbourne and together had four sons. He retired to Codrington Farm, Bowenville, Darling Downs, in 1908 and died in Toowoomba in 1926. Paull was buried in the Jondaryan Cemetery.

References

Members of the Queensland Legislative Assembly
1846 births
1926 deaths